This is a list of shopping malls in Nepal.

References

Nepal
Retail buildings in Nepal
Shopping malls